Elevated alkaline phosphatase occurs when levels of alkaline phosphatase  (ALP) exceed the reference range. This group of enzymes has a low substrate specificity and catalyzes the hydrolysis of phosphate esters in a basic environment. The major function of alkaline phosphatase is transporting chemicals across cell membranes. Alkaline phosphatases are present in many human tissues, including bone, intestine, kidney, liver, placenta and white blood cells. Damage to these  tissues causes the release of ALP into the bloodstream. Elevated levels  can be detected through a blood test. Elevated alkaline phosphate is associated with certain medical conditions or syndromes (e.g., hyperphosphatasia with mental retardation syndrome, HPMRS). It serves as a significant indicator for certain medical conditions, diseases and syndromes.

If the cause for alkaline phosphatase elevation is unknown, isoenzyme studies using electrophoresis can confirm the source of the ALP. Heat stability also distinguishes bone and liver isoenzymes ("bone burns, liver lasts").

It is essential to use age-specific normal reference values, as healthy infants and children usually have levels that would be considered elevated in adults.

Causes

Liver
  Liver (liver ALP):
 Cholestasis, cholecystitis, cholangitis, cirrhosis, primary biliary cholangitis, primary sclerosis cholangitis, fatty liver, sarcoidosis, liver tumor, liver metastases, drug intoxication
 Drugs: e.g. verapamil, carbamazepine, phenytoin, erythromycin, allopurinol, ranitidine, chlorpropamide, numerous antibiotics

Bones
 Bone disease (bone ALP):
 Paget's disease, osteosarcoma, bone metastases of prostatic cancer (High / very high ALP values)
 Other bone metastases
 Renal osteodystrophy
 Fractured bone
 Skeletal involvement of other primary diseases:
 Osteomalacia, rickets, vitamin D deficiency (moderate rise)
 Malignant tumors (ALP originating from tumor)
 Renal disease (secondary hyperparathyroidism)
 Hyperthyroidism.
Other unlisted musculoskeletal conditions may also cause elevated alkaline phosphatase.

Obesity 
Elevated levels of the alkaline phosphatase enzyme are reported among those who have obesity. A study reported there were higher serum levels of alkaline phosphatase in obese than in the non-obese. With elevated alkaline phosphatase levels, there is an increase in disproportionate intracellular fat depots and thereby releasing itself into the bloodstream. The nature of the relationship between alkaline phosphatase and obesity is still being investigated.

Kidney 
Elevated serum levels of alkaline phosphatase has been associated with chronic kidney disease (CKD). Studies have shown that elevated levels may predict mortality independent of bone metabolism factors and liver function tests in CKD.  Elevated levels are also associated with diabetes, hypertension, and cardiovascular disease; it was found that elevated levels are associated with elevated serum C-reactive protein (CRP), which could reflect an inflammatory and atherogenic milieu, possibly an alternative cause for elevated serum alkaline phosphatase.
 Chronic kidney disease

Cancer
Elevated alkaline phosphatase in patients with cancer normally spans throughout the bones or liver. Metastases that exist in the lung, breast, prostate, colon, thyroid, and further organs can also enter the liver or bone. Cancers that are already present in certain organs and tissues can produce alkaline phosphatase elevations if metastasis is not present. In experiential studies, isoenzymes, which are distinct forms of alkaline phosphatase generated by these tumors, can raise the total volume of alkaline phosphatase in the blood. The Regan isoenzyme  is one of the best studies of these isoenzymes that is linked to several human cancers. Basically, the Regan isozenzyme is an alkaline phosphatase that is located in the placenta and associated with gonadal and urologic cancers.
 Breast carcinoma
 Colon cancer
 Leukemia – cancer of the bone marrow
 Lymphoma – cancer of the white blood cells
 Pancreatic cancer
 Lung cancer

Diagnosis 
An alkaline phosphatase isoenzyme test can be done to check for elevated ALP levels. Tissues that contain high levels of ALP include the liver, bile ducts, and bones. Normal levels of ALP range from (44 to 147) U/L (units per liter) and significantly elevated levels may be an indication of conditions such as various types of cancer, bone diseases such as Paget disease, liver diseases such as hepatitis, blood disorders, or other conditions.

Elevated alkaline phosphatase is most commonly caused by liver disease or bone disorders. Testing for ALP primarily consists of obtaining a blood sample from a patient along with several other tests for the disorder in question that may be associated with the increase in ALP in the blood serum. It is possible to distinguish between the different forms (isoenzymes) of ALP produced by different types of body tissues, in order to identify the cause of elevated ALP; this can facilitate choosing a treatment course. 

Normally, children and adolescents have higher alkaline phosphatase levels than adults, due to accelerated  bone growth. ALP is especially high during the pubertal growth spurt.

Other causes

 Infectious mononucleosis
 Primary sclerosing cholangitis
 Polycythemia vera
 Myelofibrosis
 Mastocytosis
 Leukemoid reaction to infection
 Women using hormonal contraception
 Pregnancy
  Herpes zoster (shingles)
  Rickets – vitamin D deficiency
  Amyloidosis
  Granulation tissue
  Gastrointestinal inflammation – inflammatory bowel disease (ulcerative colitis, Crohn’s disease) or ulcers)
  Rheumatoid arthritis
  Ankylosing Spondylitis
 Transient hyperphosphatasaemia of infancy: benign, transient, often associated with infection
 Seminoma
 Celiac disease
 Sarcoid
 Syphilis

Treatments 
The following are the most common treatments of elevated alkaline phosphatase.
 Treatment of the underlying condition
 Once doctors identify the cause of elevated ALP and diagnose a treatment, the levels of alkaline phosphatase fluctuates back to normal
 Removal of medication – that is associated with increased levels of alkaline phosphatase
 Birth control pills
 Anti-inflammatory medication
 Narcotic medication
 Hormonal drug
 Steroid
 Antidepressant
 Dietary changes
 Include foods rich in vitamin D
 Lifestyle change
 Healthy diet in association with physical exercise
 Exposure to sunlight which increases the production of vitamin D

References

External links 

Abnormal clinical and laboratory findings for blood